U38 or U-38 may refer to:

 German submarine U-38, one of several German submarines
 RU-38 Twin Condor, American utility aircraft
 The current or one of two previous state highways numbered 38 in Utah, United States
 Utah State Route 38, a state highway in eastern Box Elder County
 Utah State Route 38 (1968-1975), a former state highway in eastern Iron County
 Utah State Route 38 (1915-1966), a former state highway in western Weber County